A Perfect Ending is a film written and directed by Nicole Conn.

Plot

The film immediately introduces the two main protagonists. Paris (Jessica Clark) is a young, dark-haired woman who works as a high-priced escort/call-girl, but is a creative artist by nature. Rebecca (Barbara Niven) is a rich, blonde, middle-aged wife. The initial voice-over also narrates a cancer affliction that has grown beyond hope.

Rebecca has lived a wealthy yet unhappy existence in creating a seemingly perfect family with her husband Mason Westridge (John Heard). The signs of trouble are their hostility towards each other and conflicting opinions about whether Jessica, Rebecca's only daughter who has a different father, should receive equal stock shares of the family business as her two half-brothers. It is revealed that Mason had attempted to, and possibly succeeded in, sexually assaulting Jessica.

Rebecca feels an emotional emptiness and confides in her two lesbian best friends that she has never had an orgasm, and that she and Mason only have sex once every six months, which is fine with her. One of her friends suggests that Rebecca try a very discreet escort service run by her own cousin (Morgan Fairchild).

It is then that Rebecca meets Paris and through a series of very discreet meetings, Rebecca eventually warms up to Paris' gentle advances and achieves her goals of having sex with another woman, and experiencing true happiness and satisfaction.

We learn that Paris, who is well appreciated for her services, seems to be in agony over a past mistake that had led her to this profession. It is implied that Paris' husband died after she accidentally pushed him into the road and he was hit by a car shortly after their wedding day. It is Rebecca who later helps Paris to let go of her past and heal.

Meanwhile, one of the three Westridge children finds the medical report of inoperable cancer that Mason Westridge has been hiding in his office desk. They all confront Rebecca and ask whether she had known about it all along. The children assume that the report refers to their father, and Rebecca tells her children that and they are not to mention it. Rebecca contacts another escort, Paris' friend, and gives her an envelope of money to help Paris leave the escort world and pursue her artistic talents. She reveals that she is the one who has cancer, and that she is dying. Afterwards, Rebecca makes the courageous decision to say goodbye to Paris.

Towards the end of the movie, Rebecca is seen as a butterfly, beautiful girl and such a kind human. Someone who has learned to spread her wings because of her relationship with Paris.  In the final scene, Paris has her own art exhibition after Rebecca's funeral. Jessica approaches Paris and introduces herself, as the two lesbian best friends watch, and says, "I want to learn about my mother at the end."

Cast
 Barbara Niven as Rebecca Westridge
 Jessica Clark as Paris
 John Heard as Mason Westridge
 Morgan Fairchild as Valentina
 Rebecca Staab as Sylvie
 Kerry Knuppe as Jessica Westridge
 Imelda Corcoran as Kelly
 Mary Jane Wells as Shirin
 Michael Adam Hamilton as Aaron Westridge
 Bryan Jackson as Hank Westridge
 Gloria Gifford as Sharon
 Marc Crumpton as Jared
 Lauryn Nicole Hamilton as Janice
 Cathy DeBuono as Dawn
 Lee Anne Matusek as Megan
 Erika Schiff as Ella
 Gary Weeks as Dr. Weller

References

External links
 
 

2012 films
2012 LGBT-related films
2010s English-language films
Films directed by Nicole Conn
Kickstarter-funded films
Lesbian-related films
LGBT-related comedy films
2012 comedy films
American LGBT-related films
American romantic comedy films
2010s American films